José Rovira was a Puerto Rican politician and senator.

In 1917, Rovira was elected as a member of the first Puerto Rican Senate established by the Jones-Shafroth Act. He represented the District VI (Guayama).

References

Members of the Senate of Puerto Rico